Whitehorse is an unincorporated community in Chester County, in the U.S. state of Pennsylvania.

History
The community was named after a local tavern which had on its signboard the image of a white horse.

References

Unincorporated communities in Chester County, Pennsylvania
Unincorporated communities in Pennsylvania